Tayap (also spelled Taiap; called Gapun in earlier literature, after the name of the village in which it is spoken) is an endangered Papuan language spoken by fewer than 50 people in Gapun village of Marienberg Rural LLG in East Sepik Province, Papua New Guinea (located just to the south of the Sepik River mouth near the coast). It is being replaced by the national language and lingua franca Tok Pisin.

History
Höltker spent three hours in the village and collected a word list of 125 words, which he published in 1938. He wrote that “it will be awhile before any other researcher ‘stumbles across’ Gapun, if only because of the small chances of worthwhile academic yields in this tiny village community, and also because of the inconvenient and arduous route leading to this linguistic island”.

Höltker's list was all that was known about Tayap in literature until the early 1970s, when the Australian linguist Donald Laycock travelled around the lower Sepik to collect basic vocabulary lists that allowed him to identify and propose classifications of the many languages spoken there. Tayap and its speakers have been extensively studied by linguistic anthropologist Don Kulick since the mid-1980s. The language is described in detail in Tayap Grammar and Dictionary: The Life and Death of a Papuan Language and in A Death in the Rainforest: How a Language and a Way of Life Came to an End in Papua New Guinea.

Until World War II, when Japanese soldiers occupied the area and caused the villagers to flee into the rainforest, Gapun was located on a hill that several thousand years earlier had been an island in the sea that receded and formed the lower Sepik River. This indicates that Tayap may be the descendant of an ancient, autochthonous language that was already in place before the various waves of migration from the inland to the coast began occurring thousands of years ago. Foley (2018) also speculates that Tayap could have been part of a larger language family that was spoken on the island before the arrival of Lower Sepik speakers. As the coastline moved further northeast, Lower Sepik speakers migrated from the foothills into the new land areas created by the receding waters.

Sociolinguistics
Up to 2018, Gapun was the only village where Tayap is spoken, although some speakers of the language also lived in neighboring villages such as Wongan and Watam, having moved there because of marriage or as a result of conflicts over land or sorcery in Gapun. However, in 2018, Gapun village was burned down and abandoned due to violence among households. The former residents fled to the nearby villages of Wongan, Watam, and Boroi.

As a result of colonial activity, Gapun villagers subconsciously associate Tok Pisin with Christianity, modernity and masculinity, and they associate Tayap with paganism, "backwardness" , disruptive femininity and childish stubbornness. As a result, Tayap is being increasingly, but neither consciously nor deliberately, replaced by Tok Pisin, even though the villagers all express positive sentiments towards it and insist that they want their children to speak the language. Villagers express bewilderment towards the fact that their children no longer actively speak Tayap, and believe that they have, out of stubbornness, decided to reject Tayap entirely, and that they have chosen to speak Tok Pisin instead.

Unlike the neighboring patrilineal Lower Sepik-Ramu speakers, Tayap speakers are matrilineal. Tayap is typologically very different from the neighboring Lower Sepik-Ramu languages.

Tayap also has many loanwords from the Kopar and Adjora languages.

Classification
Tayap is not related to the neighboring Lower Sepik languages, though a relationship to the more distant Torricelli family has been proposed by Usher (2020).

In the 1970s Australian linguist Donald Laycock classified Tayap (which he called "Gapun") as a sub-phylum of the Sepik-Ramu language phylum, on the basis of Georg Höltker's 1938 word list and a few verb paradigms that Laycock gathered from two speakers.

Kulick and Terrill (2019) found no evidence that Tayap is related to the Lower Sepik languages, another branch of the erstwhile Sepik-Ramu phylum. They conclude that Tayap is a language isolate, though they do not compare it to other language families, as would be required to establish Tayap as an independent language family. Comparative vocabulary demonstrates the lexical aberrancy of Tayap as compared to the surrounding Lower Sepik languages: e.g. sene 'two' (cf. proto-Lower Sepik *ri-pa-), neke 'ear' (*kwand-), ŋgino 'eye' (*tambri), tar 'hear' (*and-), min 'breast' (*nɨŋgay), nɨŋg 'bone' (*sariŋamp), malɨt 'tongue' (*minɨŋ), mayar 'leaf' (*nɨmpramp) among the Holman et al. (2008) ranking of the Swadesh list. Cultural vocabulary such as 'village', 'canoe', 'oar', and 'lime', as well as the basic words awin 'water' (cf. *arɨm) and a 'eat' (cf. *am ~ *amb), may be shared with Lower Sepik languages. The word karep 'moon' is shared specifically with Kopar (karep). However, most basic vocabulary items have no apparent cognates in surrounding languages.

Phonology

Pronouns
Tayap pronouns are:

{| 
!  !! sg !! pl
|-
! 1
| ŋa || yim
|-
! 2
| yu || yum
|-
! 3m
| ŋɨ || ŋgɨ
|-
! 3f
| ŋgu || ŋgɨ
|}

Grammar
Like many Sepik languages, Tayap is a synthetic language. Verbs are the most elaborated area of the grammar. They are complex, fusional and massively suppletive, with opaque verbal morphology including unpredictable conjugation class, both in terms of membership and formal marking.

Tayap distinguishes between realis and irrealis stems and suffixes. Verbal suffixes distinguish between Subject/Agent (S/A) and Object (O), which is marked by discontinuous morphemes in some conjugations. The ergative case (A) is marked by free pronouns and noun phrases, while the absolutive (S/O) does not have marked forms. As in many ergative Papuan languages, the ergative marker is not always included, as it is optional.

Nouns
Nouns generally do not mark number themselves, although there is a small class of largely human nouns which mark plural, and a smaller class which mark dual. These categories, where marked, are largely marked by partial or full suppletion. Oblique cases, largely local, are marked by clitics attached to the end of the oblique noun phrase.

Gender
Like many languages of the Sepik-Ramu basin (particularly the Sepik languages), Tayap has masculine and feminine genders.

There are two genders, masculine and feminine, marked not on the noun itself but on deictics, the ergative marker, suppletive verbal stems and verbal affixes. The unmarked, generic form of all nouns, including animate nouns, even humans, is feminine: however, a male referent may be masculine. Another criterion is size and shape: long, thin and large referents tend to be masculine; short, stocky and small referents tend to be feminine. This type of gender-assignment system is typical of the Sepik region. Gender is only ever marked in the singular, never in the dual or plural.

Lexicon
Selected Tayap words from :

Vertebrates
{| class="wikitable sortable"
! gloss !! Tayap
|-
| pig || mbor
|-
| domesticated dog || nje
|-
| tree possum, cuscus || enamb
|-
| ground possum || síw
|-
| bandicoot || sasik
|-
| rat, mouse || ŋgabugar, kokosik, njip, mangɨm
|-
| sugar glider || ŋgesiŋe
|-
| flying fox || njakep
|-
| bat || sumusumu
|-
| tree kangaroo species || kanuŋg
|-
| crocodile || orem
|-
| snake || aram
|-
| snake, types of || ambonor; arambwar; aramŋgor; atemb; karewa; kanakai aramŋgor; nɨŋɨr aram; pake; and
|-
| venomous snake species || mbumjor; kombɨn
|-
| lizard, types of || agin; akirónda; amanep; mbutak; ŋgararik; ŋgogrodak; ŋgurbewat; kurbi; masukondep; onjaŋnoŋor; tapetak
|-
| frog || pasákeke
|-
| large brown water bullfrog || uráŋgeba
|-
| tadpole || mbókokɨr < kokɨr ‘head’
|-
| fish || ŋgomar
|-
| freshwater fish || aiyo, ndɨdɨmaŋ, ŋgomákokɨr, orɨnd, semb
|-
| catfish || tokine
|-
| large eel || ŋgem
|}

Invertebrates
{| class="wikitable sortable"
! gloss !! Tayap
|-
| shrimp || sasu
|-
| small shrimp || sasupat
|-
| freshwater lobster || keymare
|-
| crab || kosep, ŋgarorak, sasápoke
|-
| hermit crab || pisik
|-
| shelled slug || kandip
|-
| clam, types of || eporaŋ, oyaŋ
|-
| mosquito || at
|-
| mosquito, type of || aiawaŋgar; indagawr; iurok; mbunbun; mɨriŋa at; njakepma arɨt; njeyewɨr at; ŋgurpan
|-
| ant || sɨwɨr
|-
| ant, type of || kandap; ŋgugrub; kambobai; rewitoto; sɨwɨrdɨdɨm; sɨwɨrkararkarar
|-
| termite || agu; kamus
|-
| spider || tomɨktomɨk
|-
| spider of the ground || tomɨktomɨk sumbwaŋa
|-
| house spider || tomɨktomɨk patɨrŋa (lit. ‘spider of the house’)
|-
| centipede || yandum
|-
| firefly || ŋgudum
|-
| bee || mbadɨŋ
|-
| bee, type of || arúmbatak kunemb; metawr
|-
| butterfly, moth || mumuk
|-
| caterpillars without fur || atɨr
|-
| caterpillars with fur || nɨŋgasin
|-
| beetle || tutumb
|-
| beetle, type of || arawer; mbirkraw onko; ŋgabugrip
|-
| beetle grub, type of || kɨmɨrɨk; komɨ; urukuruk
|-
| wasp || kɨkri
|-
| fly || arúmbatak
|-
| biting horsefly || tetei
|-
| blue fly || arúmbatak wasow (literally ’fly death’)
|-
| fruit fly, gnat || ipipir
|-
| scorpion || katáwa
|-
| millipede || kakámatik
|-
| walking stick || nekan
|-
| praying mantis || ŋgat
|-
| worm || kekékato
|-
| earwig || ikinŋan yandum
|-
| wood louse || tɨtɨpreŋ
|-
| cicada || ŋgaratgarat, kikik
|-
| grasshopper || njojok, njajak
|-
| cockroach || sasawraŋ, numbutik
|-
| bedbug || ndedeŋ
|-
| flea || itum
|-
| louse || pakɨnd
|-
| leech || mbímaŋ
|-
| mite || kandap
|}

Sago-related vocabulary
{| class="wikitable sortable"
! gloss !! Tayap
|-
| flour || muna
|-
| a kind of rubbery pancake || tamwai
|-
| broken pot shard || pambram
|-
| tennis ball-sized sago chunk || muna kokɨr, which literally means ‘sago head’
|-
| fire || paŋgɨp
|-
| congeal || munakumund
|-
| sago jelly || mum
|-
| sago soup || wawan
|-
| large chisel || makor or yasuk
|-
| tree || wot
|-
| crown of the palm || mar
|-
| sawdust || tawar
|-
| long funnel || iko or ndadum
|-
| coconut fiber strainer || waris
|-
| palm fronds || kondew
|-
| cakes of sago flour || munakatar
|-
| small benches made of branches || kokɨparaŋ
|-
| short sago-pounder made of a single piece of wood || yasuk
|-
| basket || saiput
|}

In Tayap, a felled sago palm tree can be divided into 7 parts. The Tayap names are listed below, from the base (wot) to the crown (mar).

wot
wotŋa orom
orom
ndagŋa orom
ndag
marŋa orom
mar

The word orom means ‘in the vicinity of’.

Clan names
There are five Tayap clans:

{| class="wikitable sortable"
! gloss !! Tayap
|-
| crocodile || orem
|-
| dog || nje
|-
| parrot || karar
|-
| pig || mbor
|-
| flying fox || njakep
|}

See also
Linguistic anthropology#Identity and intersubjectivity
Gapun
Don Kulick

Notes

References

 
 
 
 
 
 

 
Endangered Papuan languages
Sepik Coast languages
Languages of East Sepik Province
Language isolates of New Guinea